Baltiysky District is the name of several administrative and municipal districts in Russia.

Districts of the federal subjects
Baltiysky District, Kaliningrad Oblast, an administrative and municipal district of Kaliningrad Oblast

Historical city divisions
Baltiysky Administrative District, Kaliningrad, a former administrative district of the city of Kaliningrad, Kaliningrad Oblast

See also
Baltiysky (disambiguation)

References